Two Moons is a 1920 American silent Western film directed by Edward LeSaint and starring Buck Jones, Carol Holloway, Bert Sprotte, Edward Peil Sr., and Edwin B. Tilton. It is based on the 1920 novel Trails to Two Moons by Robert Welles Ritchie. The film was released by Fox Film Corporation on December 19, 1920.

Cast
 Buck Jones as Bill Blunt
 Carol Holloway as Hilma Ring
 Bert Sprotte as Sheriff Red Agnew
 Edward Peil Sr. as Lang Whistler
 Edwin B. Tilton as Strayhorn
 Gus Saville as Old Man Ring
 Slim Padgett as Rogers
 William Ellingford as Timberline Todd
 Louis Fitzroy as Uncle Alf
 Eunice Murdock Moore as Wooly Ann
 Eleanor Gawne as Phenie
 Jim O'Neill as The Killer
 Billy Fay as Von Tromp
 May Foster as Red Agnew's Wife
 Dick La Reno as The Blacksmith

Preservation
The film is now considered lost.

See also
 List of lost films
 1937 Fox vault fire

References

External links
 

1920 films
1920 Western (genre) films
American black-and-white films
Fox Film films
Films based on American novels
Lost American films
Lost Western (genre) films
1920 lost films
Silent American Western (genre) films
Films directed by Edward LeSaint
1920s American films